This is a listing of some of the works of Jean Fréour.

The Oratory (worship) Notre-Dame de la Sainte Espérance at Louisfert
This statue by Fréour by the Église Saint-Pierre-es-liens celebrated a pilgrimage to the location in 1947. It depicts the "Vierge à l'Enfant".

"Les Laveuses d'huîtres"
Fréours bronze sculpture depicting two Breton women washing oysters stands in Cancale's place de l'église.

René Guy Cadou
Fréour was the sculptor of a bust of this poet which is located in Bourgneuf-en-Retz

Monument to Pierre Bouguer
This monument stands in Le Croisic, Bouguer's birthplace in 1698. Bouguer was a French mathematician. Fréour executed the sculpture of Bouguer for the monument.

Chapelle Saint-Louis
Fréour sculpted a statue of St Louis for the façade of this Mesquer-Quimiac chapel and inside the church is his sculpture "Vierge à l'Enfant".

The "Église Sainte-Thérèse"
Jean was commissioned to execute work for this church in Nantes.

Église Ste Thérèse in Muzillac
After a fire in 1929 the church was rebuilt by 1934. There are two works by Fréour in this church dating to 1955. One is carved from exotic wood and depicts the Virgin Mary and the other of St Joseph is carved from oak. It has been recorded that Fréour based his depiction of St Joseph on himself.

Église de Notre Dame de Grâce
For this church in Guenrouët, Fréour was commissioned to execute the statues for the lateral altars; Mary presenting Jesus, this carved from Limewood, St Anne carved from oak and St Joseph as carpenter.

Le Loroux-Bottereau

In 1957 Fréour sculpted the figure of Christ in rose-coloured granite, and this has been attached to an old 18th-century windmill, the "moulin du Pé", which is effectively a calvary. The figure is 5.6 metres high.

Le Pouliguen
For the church of Saint Nicolas, Fréour executed two sculptures in 1958. In the choir area of the church is a "Christ en Gloire" and also in the church interior there is a sculpture by Fréour showing Joseph and the young Jesus as an apprentice carpenter.

Bust of Charles Cornic
 
This Fréour bust of the French sailor, admiral and privateer during the Revolution (corsair) was erected on 22 April 1947. It stands by the entry to Morlaix' port. A bronze bust had been erected in 1897, but melted down in 1942. In 1947 the replacement was sculpted by Fréour but in stone. He used the original mould which had been preserved.

Mouais
The Notre-Dame de la Trinité church has a "poutre de gloire" (Rood screen) over the entry to the choir with a 15th-century carving of Jesus in the centre, surrounded by Fréours sculptures depicting Mary and John the Evangelist.

"La Porteresse"

This 1983 bronze sculpture by Fréour stands outside Batz-sur-Mer's museum devoted to the history of the local salt marshes. It depicts a woman carrying salt contained in a wooden receptacle called a "gède". She carried the "gède" balanced on her head.  In the days before mechanization this was how the salt was taken from the salt marsh, the porters being more often than not women. The museum was founded back in 1887 to record and display information on this age-old Breton industry.  The 1650 hectares of the Guérande salt marshes around the Traict du Croisic extend to the towns of Batz-sur-Mer, Guérande and La Turballe.  The second large salt marsh in the area, the Mès marsh, extends to the towns of Mesquer, St Molf and Assérac. The people who harvested the salt were known as "paludiers" (female "paludières").  In 1955 Fréour had decided to live and work in Batz-sur-Mer after living near Châteaubriant. In fact he served as the mayor of Batz-sur-Mer for a period of one year.

Eglise Saint-Guénolé
This church in Batz-sur-Mer contains three sculptures by Fréour. One is a depiction of Christ and is located near the St John the Baptist altar, the second is a statue entitled "Notre-Dame du Précieux Sang" and the third a composition entitled "la Sainte Famille".

The Calvary near Nozay, Loire-Atlantique
In 1947 Fréour worked on the calvary at Créviac.  His composition depicted Christ on the Cross with the Virgin Mary and John the Evangelist at the base. He added some relief carvings depicting scenes from Jesus' life and a sculpture showing Christ being brought down from the Cross.

The parish church of Mesquer
For this church, Fréour executed a sculpture for the crèche and a sculpture for one of the church's altars

Châteaubriant
Fréours 1950 statue depicting Saint Rita can be seen in the Église de Béré.

Villepot
In Villepot's Notre Dame de l’Assomption church there are two works by Fréour. Both carved from wood, one depicting Jesus and the other the Virgin Mary.

Église Sainte-Anne Lamotte-Beuvron
Fréour executed statues of St Vincent de Paul and Jeanne d'Arc for this church

"Le Bon Pasteur"
The Saint-Sauveur church in Bouvron, Loire-Atlantique suffered much war damage in the 1939-1945 war and in 1955 Fréour created a high relief sculpture entitled "Le Bon Pasteur" for the church façade.

The Breton calvary
This sculpture in the Saint-Charles de Potyze French military  cemetery in Ypres is arguably Fréours best known work.  It is a war memorial and in Belgium but uses the Breton calvary to remind us of the sacrifice made by all the soldiers of Breton in the 1914-1918 war as well as all those buried in the cemetery.

Anne de Bretagne
This famous Jean Fréour bronze is located in the Château des ducs de Bretagne.

Notre-Dame-des-Langueurs
For this church in Joué-sur-Erdre, Fréour executed a sculpture which depicted Jesus with St Joseph, St Anthony, St Mainboeuf and the Virgin Mary and Mary Magdelane. He also executed a calvary in 1954.

Sainte Thérèse de Lisieux
In the parish church of Bruz there is a statue of Sainte Thérèse de Lisieux by Fréour.

Statue of St Conwoïon
This Fréour sculpture can be seen in Redon. It was blessed in 1958 and is 2.3 metres high.

Armand Tuffin de La Rouërie
This bronze 1993 monument stands in Fougères's Place Aristide Briand (Square des Fusillés). Tuffin de La Rouërie was a Breton cavalry officer who served under the American flag during the American War of Independence. The bronze was cast by the Châtillon foundry Fonderie Valsuani. The inscription reads The original statue was melted down in 1942 so that the metal could be used again. Freour based his sculpture on a mould left by the Derbré foundry.

Chapelle Notre-Dame-de-Merquel
This small chapel at the pointe de Merquel, Mesquer was destroyed by the Germans in 1944 and rebuilt in 1949.  It contains a statue of St Médard by Fréour. He carried out this work in polychromed wood in 1950.

Émile Le Scanff
This Breton singer was known as "Glenmor" and Fréour worked on his memorial in Rennes's parc du Thabor. The memorial was erected in 1998.

Saint-Étienne-de-Mer-Morte
Fréour was responsible for the decoration of the church altar in 1946.

Statue of General Marie-Pierre Kœnig
Fréour was the sculptor of the statue of Kœnig inaugurated in 1991.  Kœnig had fought as a sergeant in the 36th Infantry in the 1914-1918 war and in the following years he received regular promotions. He fought with the Free French forces ("Forces Françaises Libres") at Bir-Hakeim against Rommel, became the first military governor of Paris after it was liberated, became a French Minister of War and at the end of what was a glittering career was made a "Maréchal de France" in 1984. The statue stands at the Écoles de St Cyr-Coëtquidan.

Notre-Dame-de-Boulogne
There is a granite sculpture by the Nort-sur-Erdre harbour of the Virgin Mary and the infant Jesus. It was erected in December 1949 and dedicated to Notre- Dame-de Boulogne or as she is sometimes called "Notre Dame du Bon Retour". It was a place of pilgrimage for those praying for the safety of those who were held as prisoners in Germany . In Freour's sculpture Notre- Dame-de Boulogne is aboard a small boat.

Le Musee du pays de Guérande
This museum holds an early work by Freour. It is a sculpture in wood depicting a "Bigouden at prayer". It dates to 1942.

References

Lists of works of art